Ambelim (Konkani: Ambelle) is a large village that's located within the Salcete taluka and falls under the South Goa district. It shares its border with Velim and Assolna villages. The village has a predominant population from the fishing and scheduled tribe communities and has a population of about 3500 residents in seven wards.

Government and politics
Ambelim comes under the Velim Assembly constituency and is home to the Velim MLA, Cruz Silva.

Notable people 
Benjamin Silva (former MLA of Velim Assembly constituency)
Cruz Silva (current MLA of Velim Assembly constituency)

See also 
Salcete territory

References

External links 
Our Lady of Lourdes Chapel, Ambelim

Villages in South Goa district